Something Simple is Stuart Davis' fourteenth studio album which was released in 2008.

Track listing
"Already Free"
"The River"
"Deity Freak"
"Wand"
"Twisted Mystery"
"Fear of Light"
"Nothing In Between"
"Sugar Bullets"
"Sky God"
"Universe Communion"
"Miracle"
"White Plum"

References

2008 albums
Pop rock albums by American artists